Marked for Death is the soundtrack to the 1990 film, Marked for Death. It was released by Delicious Vinyl and consisted of a blend of hip hop, R&B and reggae music and featured most of the label's roster.

Track listing
"I Wanna Do Something Freaky to You"- 4:30 (Kenyatta) 
"I Joke But I Don't Play"- 4:33 (Tone Lōc) 
"Roots & Culture"- 4:00 (Shabba Ranks)  
"Put the Funk Back in It"- 5:45 (Brand New Heavies)  
"Welcome to My Groove"- 4:52 (Mellow Man Ace)  
"Quiet Passion"- 4:40 (N'Dea Davenport) 
"Domino"- 3:46 (Masters of Reality) 
"The Shadow of Death"- 4:32 (Def Jef and Papa Juggy) 
"Ya Gets None"- 5:02 (Body & Soul)  
"Rats Chase Cats"- 3:47 (Attic Black) 
"Pick Up the Pace"- 3:18 (Young MC) 
"Weapons Montage"- 2:06 (Tom Scott and James Newton Howard) 
"John Crow"- 3:44 (Jimmy Cliff and Steven Seagal) 
"Stepping Razor"- 5:47 (Peter Tosh)  
"No Justice"- 4:02 (Jimmy Cliff)  
"Rebel in Me"- 4:08 (Jimmy Cliff)

Hip hop soundtracks
1990 soundtrack albums
Delicious Vinyl soundtracks
Rhythm and blues soundtracks
Action film soundtracks